Hemimeniidae is a family of molluscs belonging to the order Neomeniamorpha.

Genera:
 Archaeomenia Thiele, 1906 
 Hemimenia Nierstrasz, 1902

References

Molluscs